Tod Lindberg is an American political expert and a current Senior Fellow at the Hudson Institute, having previously been at Stanford University's Hoover Institution. His research focuses on political theory, international relations, national security policy, and American politics. He was also the editor of Policy Review, the Hoover Institution's bimonthly journal. He is a member of the Council on Foreign Relations.

A native of Syracuse, New York, Lindberg is a 1982 honors graduate in political science of the College of the University of Chicago, where he studied political philosophy with Allan Bloom and Saul Bellow. He is also an adjunct associate professor at Georgetown University’s Walsh School of Foreign Service.

Professional career 
Lindberg has worked as an editor for The Washington Times and The Public Interest. In 2007 to 2008, Lindberg served as lead of the expert group on international norms and institutions of the Genocide Prevention Task Force, a joint project of the United States Holocaust Memorial Museum, the American Academy of Diplomacy, and the United States Institute of Peace. In 2005, Lindberg served as coordinator for the task group on Preventing and Responding to Genocide and Major Human Rights Abuses for the United States Institute of Peace’s Task Force on the United Nations. He was a member of the Steering Committee of the Princeton Project on National Security, for which he served as co-chair of the working group on anti-Americanism. He is a member of the Board of Visitors of the Institute on Political Journalism at Georgetown University. He was, from 2004 to 2008, a member of the U.S. National Commission on UNESCO.

He currently teaches an "Ethics and Decision Making In International Politics," both to graduate students at Georgetown University and to undergraduates at Indiana University. He also maintains an interest in philosophy and classical texts, having written books on The Political Teachings of Jesus (2007) and The Heroic Heart: Greatness Ancient and Modern (2014), along with a long poem, "The Apology of Patrocolus," published in Commentary magazine.

Publications 
 Beyond Paradise and Power: Europe, America, and the Future of a Troubled Partnership (Routledge, 2004) 
 Bridging the Foreign Policy Divide (Routledge, 2007) 
 Means to an End: U.S. Interest in the International Criminal Court (Brookings Press, 2009) 
 The Political Teachings of Jesus (HarperCollins, 2007) 
 The Heroic Heart: Greatness Ancient and Modern (Encounter Books, 2014)

References

External links 
 Lindberg's Hoover Institution Page
 Lindberg's Hudson Institution Page
 Lindberg's Personal Web Site
 
 "Tod Lindberg: The Politics of Heroism," Presentation for The Program on Constitutional Government at Harvard University

Living people
1960 births
American political commentators
Hoover Institution people
The Washington Times people